Begin to Hope is the fourth album by Soviet-born American singer-songwriter Regina Spektor. It was released June 13, 2006. The album debuted at number 70 on the Billboard 200, but due to the popularity of the single "Fidelity", it peaked at number 20 and was labeled a "pace setter" by Billboard. Rolling Stone named it the 21st-best album of 2006. The album was certified Gold by the RIAA for shipments to U.S. retailers of 500,000 units.

The album was nominated for the 2006 Shortlist Music Prize.

Peter Gabriel recorded a cover of "Après Moi" on his orchestral album Scratch My Back, released in 2010.

Track listing 
All songs written by Regina Spektor.
 "Fidelity" – 3:47
 "Better" – 3:22
 "Samson" – 3:10
 "On the Radio" – 3:22
 "Field Below" – 5:18
 "Hotel Song" – 3:29
 "Après Moi" – 5:08
 "20 Years of Snow" – 3:31
 "That Time" – 2:39
 "Edit" – 4:53
 "Lady" – 4:45
 "Summer in the City" – 3:50

Deluxe Edition bonus disc
 "Another Town" – 4:07
 "Uh-Merica" – 3:16
 "Baobabs" – 2:02
 "Düsseldorf" – 3:09
 "Music Box" – 2:11

iTunes Store/Amazon MP3 bonus tracks
 "Hero" – 3:44
 "Bartender" – 3:12

Vinyl edition disc 2, side A
 "Another Town" – 4:10
 "Uh-Merica" – 3:19
 "Baobabs" – 2:04
 "Düsseldorf" – 3:12
 "Music Box" – 2:07

Vinyl edition disc 2, side B
 "Better" (Piano and Voice) – 3:09
 "Better" (Radio Recut) – 3:12
 "Hero" – 3:45
 "Bartender" – 3:12
Vinyl 10th Anniversary edition disc 2, side B Bonus Track
 "Baby Jesus" – 2:43

Personnel 
 Regina Spektor – piano, vocals, guitar, percussion
 Nick Valensi – guitar on "Better"
 David Kahne – bass on "Better"
 Zhao Gang – erhu on "Field Below"
 Ralph U. Williams – saxophone on "Lady"
 Shawn Pelton – drums on "Fidelity", "Better", "On the Radio", "Hotel Song", "Après Moi" & "That Time"
 Rachel Beth Egenhoefer – album design
 David Kahne – mainstream pop producer

Charts

Weekly charts

Year-end charts

Certifications

Single success 
In 2006, Regina Spektor's first single, "Fidelity", premiered on VH1. Soon after, VH1 included her among "You Oughta Know: Artists on the Rise".

Spektor performed "Fidelity" on Late Night with Conan O'Brien in July 2006 and on ABC's Good Morning America in April 2007. She also performed "On The Radio" on Jimmy Kimmel Live! in November 2006. She performed the song again on Late Show with David Letterman in April 2007, and on the Australian Rove McManus show in 2007.

"Better" was released to US radio in late July 2007.

Even though it was not released as a single, "Hotel Song" has reached No. 11 in the Irish music download charts and No. 16 in the Irish Top 50 Singles Chart as of May 2007.

"Samson" is a new recording of a song originally released on 2002's Songs. Gwen Stefani used the song for her Season 9 battle between Korin Bukowski and Chase Kerby on The Voice.

"Après Moi" was covered by Peter Gabriel on his 2010 album Scratch My Back.

In popular culture
The song, "Better" appeared in the fourth season of the CBS TV show, How I Met Your Mother, in an episode titled "Happily Ever After." A piano version of the song appeared prominently throughout the series finale of The Good Wife in 2016.
"Hotel Song" is featured in mobile phone company Vodafone's TV commercial in Ireland, contributing to the song's popularity in the country. The song was also featured in the 2011 Jennifer Westfeldt film Friends with Kids.
"Music Box" is featured on a JCPenney commercial.
"Samson" was featured on CSI: NY in the second-season episode "All Access".
"Field Below" was on an episode of Criminal Minds.
"That Time" was featured in the 2008 Martin McDonagh film In Bruges starring Colin Farrell and Brendan Gleeson.
"Hero" was featured in the film (500) Days of Summer, along with "Us" from Spektor's previous album, Soviet Kitsch.
"Fidelity" is one of the songs featured in "Elephant Love Medley," a number in Moulin Rouge! The Musical.

Sales 
In New Zealand, the album was certified Gold for sales of more than 7,500.
In Australia, the album was certified Gold for sales of more than 35,000.
In the United States, the album was certified Gold for shipments of over 500,000 copies. Its sales have since surpassed 600,000 according to Nielsen/Soundscan.

References 

2006 albums
Regina Spektor albums
Sire Records albums
Albums produced by David Kahne